= Oboama =

Oboama // Ezinihitte Mbaise is an ancient ancestral town of the Ezinihitte Mbaise people of Imo State, South East of Nigeria. Ezinihitte ancient history believed that the world was created around Orie Ukwu the Market Square located at Umunama but the Market is called Orie Ukwu Oboama/Umunama while the location of the Market is at Umunama Land. The Following towns make up the communities in Ezinihitte (Oboama, Umunama, Ife na Owutu, Akpoku na Umudim, Ihitte, Umuchoko na Umueze, Eziagbogu, Okpuofe, Amaumara, Itu, Eziudo, Onicha, Udo na Obizi).

Oboama is made up eleven Villages Namely: Umuekwere, Umuohii, Umuatum (making up Amato), Umuogwogwo, Umuosehi, Umuodoko, Umuozuzu, Ogbor (making up Umuasha), Nru, Umunehi and Umualika (making Up Umueze).

The current traditional ruler of Oboama Ezinihitte Mbaise is Eze Juluis Amaefule.

Oboama is noted for its dance group called Abigbo. It has spread around the Mbaise District of Imo State in southeast Nigeria.
